Private Detective 62  is a 1933 American pre-Code detective film directed by Michael Curtiz and starring William Powell as a private detective who falls for a woman whom he has been hired to frame in a scandal.

Plot
In France, United States State Department employee Donald Free (William Powell) is caught trying to steal French state papers. Free is released from his job and is deported. Back in the US, Free has a hard time finding another job due to the Great Depression. Free convinces Dan Hogan (Arthur Hohl), the crooked and incompetent owner of the Peerless Detective Agency, to partner with him. Without Free's knowledge, Hogan becomes financed by gangster Tony Bandor (Gordon Westcott) and business booms.

Bandor complains that a society woman, Janet Reynolds (Margaret Lindsay), is winning too much at his gambling tables and hires Hogan to find some scandal he can use to prevent her from collecting her winnings. Hogan engages Free, without telling him the truth behind the request. But, while keeping an eye on Reynolds, Free falls in love with her. When Reynolds informs Bandor that she wants to collect her winnings, Hogan suggests to Bandor that they make Reynolds think she has killed Bandor under suspicious conditions. Hogan then double-crosses Bandor by hiring a thug to shoot him after Reynolds leaves the apartment. Reynolds, not knowing what to do, asks Free to help her. Free learns the identity of Bandor's actual killer and traces him back to Hogan. Meanwhile, Hogan tries to blackmail Janet. After Free has Hogan arrested, he is offered his old job again, but tells Reynolds that it is not the sort of life he could ask anyone to share with him so he leaves. As he is leaving, Reynolds proposes to him and he accepts.

Cast

 William Powell as Free
 Margaret Lindsay as Reynolds
 Ruth Donnelly as Amy  
 Gordon Westcott as Bandor  
 Arthur Hohl as Hogan  

 Natalie Moorhead as Helen 
 James Bell as Whitey  
 Hobart Cavanaugh as Burns  
 Irving Bacon as taxi driver

Charles Lane also appears in this film as the "PROCESS CLERK"

Production
The film's working titles were Private Detective and Man Killer. According to production records in the file on the film in the AMPAS library, the film was shot over twenty-one days at a cost of $260,000. Modern sources list Hal B. Wallis as supervisor.

References

External links

1933 films
Films directed by Michael Curtiz
1933 crime films
American black-and-white films
1930s English-language films
American detective films
American crime films
1930s American films
Films scored by Bernhard Kaun
Great Depression films